The 2013 World Table Tennis Championships men's doubles was the 52nd edition of the men's doubles championship.

Chen Chien-an and Chuang Chih-yuan defeated Hao Shuai and Ma Lin 9–11, 12–10, 11–6, 13–11, 9–11, 11–8 in the final to win the title.

Seeds
Doubles matches were best of 5 games in qualification matches and best of 7 games in the 64-player sized main draw.

  Hao Shuai /  Ma Lin (final)
  Wang Liqin /  Zhou Yu (semifinals)
  Chen Qi /  Fang Bo (third round)
  Gao Ning /  Yang Zi (second round)
  Kenta Matsudaira /  Koki Niwa (third round)
  Kim Min-Seok /  Seo Hyun-Deok (quarterfinals)
  Chen Chien-an /  Chuang Chih-yuan (champions)
  Jiang Tianyi /  Leung Chu Yan (third round)
  Seiya Kishikawa /  Jun Mizutani (semifinals)
  Kazuhiro Chan /  Kenji Matsudaira (quarterfinals)
  Robert Gardos /  Daniel Habesohn (quarterfinals)
  Alexander Shibaev /  Kirill Skachkov (second round)
  Patrick Baum /  Bastian Steger (third round)
  Jung Young-Sik /  Lee Sang-Su (third round)
  Kristian Karlsson /  Mattias Karlsson (third round)
  Alexey Liventsov /  Mikhail Paykov (third round)
  Tiago Apolónia /  João Monteiro (third round)
  Stefan Fegerl /  Feng Xiaoquan (first round)
  Thiago Monteiro /  Gustavo Tsuboi (second round)
  Pär Gerell /  Jens Lundqvist (second round)
  Adrien Mattenet /  Quentin Robinot (second round)
  Christophe Legoût /  Abdel-Kader Salifou (second round)
  Adrian Crişan /  Andrei Filimon (second round)
  Panagiotis Gionis /  Konstantinos Papageorgiou (first round)
  Chiang Hung-chieh /  Huang Sheng-sheng (quarterfinals)
  Robert Floras /  Daniel Gorak (first round)
  Mihai Bobocica /  Niagol Stoyanov (first round)
  Bojan Tokič /  Jan Zibrat (first round)
  Andrej Gaćina /  Tomislav Kolarek (second round)
  He Zhi Wen /  Carlos Machado (second round)
  Simon Gauzy /  Emmanuel Lebesson (second round)
  Tang Peng /  Wong Chun Ting (second round)

Draw

Finals

Top half

Section 1

Section 2

Bottom half

Section 3

Section 4

References

External links
Main Draw

Men's doubles